Vitali Yevgenyevich Sychyov (born 2 March 2000) is a Russian football player. He plays for FC Akron Tolyatti.

Club career
He was raised in the academy of FC Lokomotiv Moscow and was first called up to the senior squad in December 2018, but remained on the bench. Before the 2019–20 season, he moved to FC Tambov.

He made his debut in the Russian Premier League for FC Tambov on 14 March 2021 in a game against FC Krasnodar.

On 24 June 2021, he signed with FC Khimki.

On 23 July 2022, Sychyov moved to FC Akron Tolyatti in the Russian First League.

Career statistics

References

External links
 
 

2000 births
Sportspeople from Barnaul
Living people
Russian footballers
Russia youth international footballers
Association football goalkeepers
FC Lokomotiv Moscow players
FC Tambov players
FC Khimki players
FC Olimp-Dolgoprudny players
FC Akron Tolyatti players
Russian Premier League players
Russian First League players
Russian Second League players